Francisco José Blanco is a chemist working on structural biology at the Spanish National Research Council (CSIC), in Madrid, Spain.  His research utilizes Nuclear Magnetic Resonance spectroscopy to characterize protein structure and interactions relevant in cancer. Early in his career he worked in protein folding, describing the formation of β-hairpin structures in short linear peptides. He has co-authored 121 scientific publications that have been cited over 5000 times, with an h-index of 39.

References 

Spanish medical researchers
Living people
Year of birth missing (living people)